The Weekly Worker is a newspaper published by the Communist Party of Great Britain (Provisional Central Committee) (CPGB-PCC). The paper is known on the left for its polemical articles, and for its close attention to Marxist theory and the politics of other Marxist groups. It claims a weekly online readership averaging over 20,000, Weekly Worker simultaneously also distributes 500 physical copies a week.

Outlook 

The CPGB-PCC's declared intention is to emulate Iskra in providing Marxist analysis of politics and organisation to an initial vanguard of the working class. The Weekly Worker is integral to the CPGB-PCC's identity, given that the party, probably dialectically, does not consider itself to be a Marxist party. It aims instead to have the paper provide a focus for Communist organisation and theory that will be absorbed by a Marxist party that will arrive in a time of greater working-class activism.

The paper has a policy of printing a variety of viewpoints. For example, it has printed articles by the Revolutionary Democratic Group (RDC) over a significant part of the paper's history. The paper has also given columns to factions within the CPGB-PCC, notably the Red Platform faction during a debate over the CPGB-PCC's stance towards the newly founded Respect. The Weekly Worker is known for its reporting of the activities of other left-wing groups, with a particular focus on the Socialist Workers Party and the Alliance for Workers' Liberty. Critics regard this as trading in gossip and amounting to sectarianism, a charge inverted by the CPGB-PCC.

The paper prides itself on publishing a variety of letters, including critical ones. This has often resulted in lengthy debates being conducted through the letters section, leading to a set of familiar names appearing repeatedly.

The paper has also attracted many activists who are not members of the CPGB-PCC to write articles. Leading UK gay rights activist Peter Tatchell, former Soviet dissident Boris Kagarlitsky, Marxist scholar Hillel Ticktin (editor of the magazine Critique) and Graham Bash of Labour Left Briefing have been regular contributors.

Structure 
The paper is typically around sixteen pages long (after having been eight pages long until the mid-1990s). Rarely it incorporates publications by other attached groups such as Communist Students. The basic structure is:
 Front Page: typically of magazine format, with a large striking image and overlaid text. The image tends to be artistic: examples include Hieronymus Bosch's The Garden of Earthly delights to a picture of Barack Obama titled "World's No 1' Terrorist"
 Letters Page: one or two pages of letters sent to the paper during the week.
 Action Column: a column containing upcoming events
 News: the next few pages typically contain Marxist interpretation of World News
 Left Politics: this tends to be followed by articles outlining developments with the left-wing political sphere
 Theory and Reviews: towards the end of the paper there are articles dealing theoretical issues in Marxism, historical points and reviews of recent plays books etc.
 Final News Item: the paper typically ends with a Marxist interpretation and response to a world event.

The paper runs a weekly section 'What we Fight for' outlining in bullet point the core programme of the CPGB-PCC.

It also has a "Fighting Fund" section, where "Robbie Rix" encourages readers into donating to the paper while providing an update on readership levels. In September 2008 the paper decided to increase its monthly fund raising targets from £500 per month to £1,000. The party is reasonably successful in raising these small, for political party, amounts. The Fighting fund is replaced during the main fund raising drive, the Summer Offensive, with updates on the offensive. Typically the party set themselves the task of raising around £25,000. The paper vigorously denies other sources of funding, priding itself on being solely funded by the membership of the party and readership.

Production 
The Weekly Worker developed out of The Leninist. After the transition to becoming the Weekly Worker the party succeeded in buying its own printing press. The machine was also operated by a party member, Phil Kent, giving the party complete control over publishing, something it considered integral to its independence. The paper was for the 1990s a large broadsheet printed in black and red, although towards the end of the decade the paper started to develop a web presence. As the new millennium moved on the online version of the Weekly Worker became more important, till print readership became a small fraction of the total readership.

In 2008 the party's press broke irreversibly. After considering stopping print publication altogether the party decided to focus on web publication but attempt to develop the facilities to print an A4 version of the Weekly Worker. The party has been involved in its archive of both the Weekly Worker and The Leninist, whilst modernising and overhauling its website.

Back issues of The Leninist were published online in July 2012. In May 2014, the Weekly Worker moved to a website separate from the party website.

History 
The paper was first published in 1993, having developed out of The Leninist, the eponymous underground publication of the left group opposed to the Euro-communist leadership of the by then dissolved Communist Party of Great Britain (CPGB). The group was defined by their adherence to orthodox Soviet Marxism and their strong opposition to Euro-communism within the former CPGB. This found primary expression in their stance towards the Soviet Union, where they denounced Mikhail Gorbachev's reforms and the developments within the Warsaw Pact. The party's position was as rigorous to lead the group to publish denouncements of the Polish Solidarność trade union for agitation against the workers regime. Such positioning was charactured by the nickname "Tankies".

The Leninist had a convoluted path to publication. After a factional confrontation with the then Euro-communist leaning leadership, a group called the New Communist Party (NCP) split from the CPGB in 1977. An event later regretted as premature and having been a move away from the real site of class struggle, the CPGB. A part of the NCP engaged close alliance with the Communist Party of Turkey (CPT), which left a lasting influence on the groups philosophy. A result of this contact with an active and intellectually lively communist organisation was disillusionment with the inadequacies of the NCP. Another split followed, leading to six joining the CPT and becoming active members. After a period of years this small grouplet, headed by John Chamberlain, decided that they should refocus on Britain's political situation. The group now numbering four members, began a two-year period of Marxist study with the aiming to "reforge the CPGB". These two years of study finally culminated in the publication of the first edition of The Leninist.

After the dissolution of the CPGB, the group around The Leninist declared their intention to reforge the party on what they declared to be "firm Leninist principles". They organised an "emergency conference", at which they claimed the CPGB name, but not its assets. The group are technically named the CPGB-PCC but commonly known as just the CPGB. They are distinct from the Communist Party of Britain, which has the electoral rights to the Communist Party name, and the Communist Party of Great Britain (Marxist-Leninist). After having made this transition the group  began the first publication of the Weekly Worker shortly after in 1993 and began its attempts to 'reforge the CPGB'.

The 1990s marked a period of introspection for the group. The nature of the Soviet Union was reappraised as being Stalinist, however the group reaffirmed their Leninist heritage (as opposed to the Trotskyist heritage of many other left groups). Having decided on the central importance of re-evaluating theory, this debate was primarily conducted through the Weekly Worker.

The Weekly Worker was a faultline during unity negotiations between left groups during the Socialist Alliance. It was proposed that the groups within the SA produced a single paper. This would have resulted in the loss of the Weekly Worker, something that was contentious within the CPGB, both pro and against. The discussions however became moot after the Socialist Workers Party decided to leave the Socialist Alliance and join the movement that would result in the formation of Respect – The Unity Coalition.

The formation of Respect – The Unity Coalition marked an upswing in the importance of the Weekly Worker. The CPGB was initially divided whether to embrace the organisation, the PCC initially sided with the pro-affiliation faction led by Ian Donovan. It however reversed this position early in Respect's life to agree retrospectively with the anti-affiliation faction; Red Platform led by Manny Neira. This reversal managed to alienate both factions at different times, resulting initially in Manny Neira breaking away to form the short lived Red Party, followed by Ian Donovan after the change of position. This early debate though settled into a strong editorial line against Respect, for being an 'unprincipled unpopular front', which followed through to the split resulting in Respect Renewal and Left List. The paper's commitment to angular debate and reporting on the topic, combined with the lack of coverage from more official sources, led to increase in readership. The paper, at the height of the Respect project, reached 40,000 readers a week. This controversy has refreshed the party, seemingly leading to a new wave of confidence and generation of recruits.

The paper offered to become the paper of the Campaign for a Marxist Party. This collapsed after repeated disagreements about Marxist theory and the logistics of running the movement with members of the Democratic Socialist Alliance. The paper has also been at the forefront over debates between the CPGB-PCC and the Alliance for Workers Liberty over Communist policy towards Israel.

In line with Marxist tradition the actual CPGB-PCC contributors write under a variety of assumed names. John Chamberlain usually calls himself "Jack Conrad" or "John Bridge". This explains the multiplicity of authors but familiar sets of prose. The Weekly Worker has been estimated to have as few as 37 members as of 2007 (which is consistent with the £1,000 the party attempts to raise through the paper every month to cover printing costs). This is an increase on the 10 or so who were initially part of The Leninist.

John Chamberlain and Mike Macnair are reasonable indicators of the party position, with both sitting on the central committee of the CPGB-PCC, writing leading articles on theory and being the only members to have had books published by the party.

References

External links 
 Weekly Worker website

Communist newspapers
Communist Party of Great Britain
Publications established in 1993
Weekly newspapers published in the United Kingdom
1993 establishments in the United Kingdom
Socialist newspapers published in the United Kingdom